Ebele Okoye  (born 6 October 1969, Onitsha, Anambra State) is a Nigerian-American painter and animator based in Cologne, Germany since 2000.

Education
Okoye studied Fine and Applied Arts (Graphic design/Illustration) at the Institute of Management and Technology in Enugu from 1985 to 1989. On arriving in Germany in 2000, she did a guest program at the University of Cologne, which she promptly left to go register in Communication Design at the University of Applied Sciences in Düsseldorf. 
From 2003 to 2004, she trained in traditional 2D cartoon animation at the Internationale Filmschule Köln. She is a fluent speaker of Igbo, English, and German.

Career
Ebele Okoye is active in fine and media arts and constantly shows her works in both one-man and group exhibitions (see below). She is the founder of Shrinkfish Media Lab, a production company based in Abuja. 

Okoye's 2015 film The Legacy of Rubies was one of the two closing films at the 2015 Silicon Valley African Film Fest. That year, the film won the Africa Movie Academy Award for Best Animation. Okoye stated that "I did not make this film to chase awards," in her acceptance speech in South Africa. "I made this film, to inspire every African animator who wants to make animation films." The Legacy of Rubies had its Canadian premiere at the Toronto Black Film Festival in 2016.

In 2016 she announced plans for a feature-length film, hinting that it might be "like Chronicles of Narnia and Pocahontas put together."

Awards
Her 2007 project Anna Blume, based on a 1919 poem by Kurt Schwitters, won the Robert Bosch Foundation Promotional Prize for Animation. Okoye has won two Africa Movie Academy Awards, for The Lunatic (2008) and for The Legacy of Rubies (2015).

Selected group exhibitions 
 1995 Mirrors of Society - National Museum, Lagos (Nigeria)
 1996 Nigeria/China Co-operative exhibition, Lagos (Nigeria)
 1996 Selected Nigerian artists as chosen by the National Gallery of Modern Art, Nigeria (South Korea)
 1997 Small-Small Things - National Museum, Lagos (Nigeria)
 1998 The Rape of Nature - Brazilian Embassy, Lagos (Nigeria)
 2000 Threshold of Peace - African First-ladies' Peace-Summit exhibition, Abuja (Nigeria)
 2001 Women about Women - Goethe Institut, Lagos (Nigeria)
 2003 Ipade Begegnung - Afroasian Institute Gallery Vienna (Austria)
 2004 Globalia - Frauenmuseum (Women's Museum), Bonn (Germany)

Selected solo exhibitions 
 2003 Between Territories - Galerie Haus 23 Cottbus, Germany
 2002 Nomadic Diaries (A travelling pictorial storytelling) - Munich, Cologne, Halle; Germany & Neulengbach, Austria
 2001 Woman about Women - Cologne Germany
 1999 New Culture - Didi Museum, Lagos Nigeria
 1998 Selected Paintings and Portraits in Oil - Lagos. Nigeria
 1996 Realities - Didi Museum Lagos. Nigeria
 1995 Storms of the Heart - National Museum, Lagos Nigeria

Filmography 
 2015 The Legacy of Rubies (Germany/Nigeria/USA) 28Sp min. 2D Animation (Director/co-producer)
 2014 Die Liebe in den Zeiten der EU (Germany) 2D Animation (director/co-producer)
 2013 Closer N' Closer (Commissioned) (Nigeria/Germany) 06:00 min. 2D Animation (director/co-producer)
 2012 Meine Heimat "My Homeland" (Nigeria/Germany) 05:00 min. 2D/3D Animation (director/co-producer)
 2011 Footy My Love (Nigeria/Germany/Denmark) 07:00 Min, 2D Animation/Video Art (director/co-producer)
 2010 The Essence (Nigeria /Germany) 05:30 min., 2D Animation (director/co-producer)
 2009 Anna Blume (Germany/Bulgaria) 09 mins. 2D Animation (producer/co-script writer/animator)
 2009 Patterns (Nigeria /Germany) 10 mins. 2D Animation (director/co-producer)
 2008 Papermouse (Germany) 2,5 min. 2D Animation (director/co-producer)
 2007 Die Verrückte 'The Lunatic' (Germany) 5 min. 2D Animation (director/co-producer)
 2006 The Lunatic - 04.03 mins. 2D animation (director/animator)
 2004 Tag Attack - 05.00 mins. 2D animation. Ifs Cologne (co-director/animator)
 2002 Once upon a dance - 04.00 mins. digital collage (director/animator)

References

External links 
 Ebele Okoye's website
 

1969 births
Living people
Artists from Onitsha
Nigerian women painters
Women animators
Nigerian painters
Nigerian animators
Nigerian women film directors
Nigerian women film producers
Nigerian film producers
Nigerian animated film directors
Nigerian animated film producers
21st-century women artists